Constance Hsu is an American actress.

Filmography
Swing Vote (2008) - Chinese News Reporter
Passage (2007) - Min
Bratz: The Movie (2007) - Julie - Jade's Mom
Just Jordan - Gayle (1 episode)
Black and Blue (2005) - Chinese Kidnapper
Sleepwalking (2005) - Joan
The Civilization of Maxwell Bright (2005) - Mrs. Wroth
A Lot Like Love (2005) - Chinese Waitress
November (2004) - Wei
Eat Rice (2004) - Ching
ER (2003) - Stacie (1 episode)
Orobouros (2002)
Rush Hour 2 (2001) (uncredited) - Prostitute

External links

Year of birth missing (living people)
Living people
American film actresses
American television actresses
21st-century American women